Israel Pliner (Izrail Izrailevich Pliner) (22 January 1896 – 14 November 1938) was a Soviet officer and high functionary of the Soviet secret police. Notable posts include deputy chief of the Gulag from 1935 to 1937 and chief administrator of the Gulag from 16 August 1937 to 16 November 1938.

Early life
Pliner was born in the Vilna Governorate of the Russian Empire. His parents were Jewish.

Career
He joined the Red Army in 1919 and the Russian Communist Party (b) in 1922. Pilner was one of the main collaborators of Nikolai Yezhov, head of the NKVD in the years 1936–1938, and collaborator of other organizers of the Great Purge.

On August 16, 1937, he became the head of the board of the labor camps GULAG NKVD, five days after the beginning of the Polish Operation of the NKVD. According to NKVD documents, 139,835 Poles who were citizens of the Soviet Union were convicted in 1937. Of this number, 111,091 Poles were directly killed, and 28,744 Poles were sent to GULAG camps.

In 1937, Pilner directed the deportation of 172,000 Korean citizens of the USSR from the Soviet Far East to the Central Asian Soviet Socialist Republics of Kazakhstan and Uzbekistan.

He was arrested on charges of counter-revolutionary activities in 1938 and executed in 1939 at the NKVD's Kommunarka shooting ground.

References

1896 births
1939 deaths
Russian Jews
Jewish socialists
NKVD officers
Gulag governors
Great Purge perpetrators
Great Purge victims from Russia
Jews executed by the Soviet Union
People executed for treason against the Soviet Union
Deaths by firearm in Russia
Soviet rehabilitations